Peter Taylor (born 2 November 1934) is a South African cricketer. He played in six first-class matches for Border from 1959/60 to 1964/65.

See also
 List of Border representative cricketers

References

External links
 

1934 births
Living people
South African cricketers
Border cricketers
Cricketers from East London, Eastern Cape